Boris Orlov may refer to:

Boris Orlov (biologist) (1935–2012), Russian biologist
Boris Orlov (coach) (1945–2018), Russian gymnastics coach